Truncilla is a genus of freshwater mussels, aquatic bivalve mollusks in the family Unionidae, the river mussels.

Species within the genus Truncilla
 Truncilla donaciformis
 Truncilla macrodon
 Truncilla truncata

References

Unionidae
Bivalve genera